James Victor Cain, Jr. (July 22, 1951 – July 22, 1979) was an American football tight end for the St. Louis Cardinals of the National Football League (NFL). He played high school football at Booker T. Washington in Houston, Texas and college football at Colorado before being drafted by the Cardinals seventh overall in the 1974 NFL Draft.

Professional career 
Cain was selected seventh overall in the 1974 NFL Draft by the St. Louis Cardinals. Despite the Cardinals already having a starting tight end in Jackie Smith, general manager George Boone believed Cain was too good a talent to pass up and decided to draft him anyway to play as Smith's backup. In his first two seasons, Cain played in a total of 28 games with ten starts, totaling 286 yards and two touchdowns, and was also named the Cardinals' rookie of the year in 1974.

In 1976, Cain became a full-time starting tight end for the Cardinals, starting all 14 games and catching for 400 yards and five touchdowns. He started every game of the 1977 season as well, catching for 328 yards and two touchdowns.

In 1978, Jackie Smith joined the Dallas Cowboys, leaving Cain the top tight end on the Cardinals' roster. However, Cain then suffered an Achilles tendon injury in training camp and missed the entirety of the 1978 season. A devout Christian, Cain used his time that season to read the Bible, and prayed that after recovering from the injury, he would go on to become an All-Pro tight end. As he had hoped, Cain did make a full recovery from his Achilles injury, though he never played another down of NFL football.

Death and legacy 
On July 22, 1979, his 28th birthday, at about 8:30 p.m., Cain suddenly collapsed during a no-contact training camp practice at Lindenwood College in St. Charles, Missouri. He was revived by CPR and taken to nearby St. Joseph's Hospital, where he died less than two hours later. His death was found to be due to an extremely rare congenital heart problem, undetectable except by autopsy, which was exacerbated by strenuous exercise.

In honor of Cain, the St. Louis Cardinals football team wore black armbands during the 1979 season. Cain's number 88 is retired by the Cardinals.

Career statistics

References

1951 births
1979 deaths
American football tight ends
Colorado Buffaloes football players
St. Louis Cardinals (football) players
Players of American football from Houston
African-American players of American football
Sports deaths in Missouri
20th-century African-American sportspeople
National Football League players with retired numbers